Natalia Alexandra Mitsuoka (born November 10, 1988 in Buenos Aires) is an Argentinian figure skater. She is the first skater to represent Argentina in an ISU Championships, which she did at the 2006 World Junior Figure Skating Championships, although she failed to make it out of qualifying there. She is coached by Sid Morgan and her programs are choreographed by Nina Petrenko. She is a one-season competitor on the Junior Grand Prix circuit.

References

External links
 

1988 births
Living people
People from Buenos Aires
Argentine figure skaters
Sportspeople from Buenos Aires
Argentine people of Japanese descent
Sportspeople of Japanese descent
World Junior Figure Skating Championships